The 4th Mounted Brigade previously known as the 2/1st South Wales Mounted Brigade was a second line yeomanry brigade of the British Army during the First World War.

Raised after the declaration of war, it was a mirror formation of the first line South Wales Mounted Brigade. It had under command the 2/1st Pembroke Yeomanry, the 2/1st Montgomeryshire Yeomanry, the 2/1st Welsh Horse Yeomanry and the 2/1st Glamorgan Yeomanry. All of which were converted in cyclist units in 1916, the brigade, never having seen any active service, ceased to exist.

See also

 South Wales Mounted Brigade for the 1st Line formation
 British yeomanry during the First World War
 Second line yeomanry regiments of the British Army

References

Mounted Brigades of the British Army
Military units and formations established in 1914
Military units and formations disestablished in 1916